Jeff John Brigham (born February 16, 1992) is an American professional baseball pitcher for the New York Mets of Major League Baseball (MLB). He made his MLB debut in 2018 with the Miami Marlins.

Career
Brigham attended Thomas Jefferson High School in Auburn, Washington and played college baseball at the University of Washington.

Los Angeles Dodgers
Brigham was drafted by the Los Angeles Dodgers in the fourth round of the 2014 Major League Baseball draft. He made his professional debut with the Ogden Raptors. He started 2015 with the Great Lakes Loons and Rancho Cucamonga Quakes.

Miami Marlins
On July 30, 2015, Brigham was acquired by the Miami Marlins as part of a 13-player trade with the Atlanta Braves and Los Angeles Dodgers. He finished the season with the Jupiter Hammerheads. He pitched 2016 with Jupiter and after the season, played in the Arizona Fall League. He pitched 2017 with Jupiter and played 2018 with the Gulf Coast Marlins, Jacksonville Jumbo Shrimp and New Orleans Baby Cakes.

Brigham was promoted to the Major Leagues on September 1, 2018. Brigham had an 0–4 record with 12 strikeouts and a 6.06 ERA in 16.1 innings pitched in the 2018 season. In 2019 for Miami, Brigham made 32 appearances for the club, pitching to a 4.46 ERA and 3–2 record with 39 strikeouts in 38.1 innings of work. In 2020, Brigham only pitched one inning, allowing a single run on two hits.

On February 17, 2021, Brigham was placed on the 60-day injured list. On October 28, 2021, Brigham was outrighted off of the 40-man roster. On July 24, 2022, Brigham's contract was selected by the Marlins and was promoted to the major leagues. On November 15, Brigham was designated for assignment.

New York Mets
On November 18, 2022, the Marlins traded Brigham and Elieser Hernández to the New York Mets for Franklin Sanchez and a player to be named later or cash considerations. Jake Mangum went to Miami to complete the trade after he was not selected in the Rule 5 draft.

References

External links

1992 births
Living people
People from Federal Way, Washington
Baseball players from Washington (state)
Major League Baseball pitchers
Miami Marlins players
Washington Huskies baseball players
Ogden Raptors players
Great Lakes Loons players
Rancho Cucamonga Quakes players
Jupiter Hammerheads players
Mesa Solar Sox players
Gulf Coast Marlins players
Jacksonville Jumbo Shrimp players
New Orleans Baby Cakes players